The Spoonville site, also designated 20OT1, is a historic archeological site, located on the banks of the Grand River in Crockery Township, Ottawa County, Michigan, United States. It was placed on the National Register of Historic Places in 1973.

History 
The site, located on a terrace between Crockery Creek and the Grand River, was the location of a large Middle Woodland period village and burial mound complex.

In 1856, John Spoon and his brother, Daniel, arrived in this location and constructed a sawmill. Eventually a small town, Spoonville, grew up around the site, and in 1871, was established as a station on the Chicago and Michigan Lake Shore Railroad.

Spoon discovered three mounds on his property. The first archaeological investigation of the site was conducted by Able Anderson in 1857. Anderson excavated one of the mounds, reporting human remains and other artifacts. In 1876, William D. Gunning carried out further excavation at the site.

In 1882, the rail line through Spoonville was torn up. John Spoon died in 1892.

More recent excavations of the Spoonville site were made in 1962, and excavation of the village at the site continued through the next few decades.

Gallery

References

Further reading

External links
Spoonville artifacts at the University of Michigan Museum of Anthropological Archaeology

Ottawa County, Michigan
Archaeological sites on the National Register of Historic Places in Michigan
National Register of Historic Places in Ottawa County, Michigan